The River Tyne can refer to three rivers:

 River Tyne, England
 River Tyne, Scotland
 a tributary of the South Esk River in Tasmania